Achille Canna (born 24 July 1932) is a retired Italian basketball player. He was part of the Italian team that finished 17th and fourth at the 1952 and 1960 Summer Olympics, respectively.

References

1932 births
Living people
Italian men's basketball players
Olympic basketball players of Italy
Basketball players at the 1952 Summer Olympics
Basketball players at the 1960 Summer Olympics